Ballarat is an unincorporated community in Inyo County, California. It lies at an elevation of 1079 feet (329 m).

Today, Ballarat is a virtual ghost town. It was founded in 1897 as a supply point for the mines in the canyons of the Panamint Range. A quarter-mile to the south is Post Office Springs, a reliable water source used since the 1850s. George Riggins, an immigrant from Australia, gave Ballarat its name when he proposed it should be named for Ballarat, Victoria.

History
The town was founded in 1897. In its heyday—from 1897 to 1905—Ballarat had 400 to 500 residents. It hosted seven saloons, three hotels, a Wells Fargo station, post office (that opened in 1897), school, a jail and morgue, but no churches. Ballarat was a place for miners and prospectors to resupply and relax.

The town began to decline when the Ratcliff Mine, in Pleasant Canyon east of town, suspended operations. Other mines nearby also began to play out, and in 1917 the post office closed and all that remained were a few diehard prospectors and desert rats.

From approximately 1918 until his death at Trona Hospital in 1968 of cancer, the sole resident of Ballarat was Seldom Seen Slim (Charles Ferge). Slim claimed not to have bathed in twenty years except for sloshing water on his naked body while standing outdoors. After the town's adobe building degraded beyond liveability, Slim lived in a Volkswagen and house trailer. Slim was the 28th and final person to be interred at Ballarat's boot hill. He used to say, "Just bury me where the digging's easy."

In the 1960s, Charles Manson and the "Manson Family" of killers moved into a ranch south of Ballarat, and left graffiti in the town. The 1969 movie Easy Rider has a scene filmed in Ballarat. After arriving in the town, Peter Fonda's character, Wyatt, removes his Rolex watch and throws it away before he and Dennis Hopper's character, Billy, head east on their motorcycles towards New Orleans.

On Easter weekend, 1971, about two thousand people attended a "hippy" celebration at Ballarat.  About two hundred contracted hepatitis (A) from contaminated drinking water.

Today

Today, Ballarat has one full-time resident. As of June 2013 Rocky Novak and his dogs, Potlicker and Brownie, live in the town. Rocky runs the general store on afternoons and weekends to supply tourists, and is working on repairing the water pipes that supply the town, for which he is paid by the government. Rocky was featured in the 2018 film vignette "The Mayor of Ballarat" by Mickey Todiwala and Monika Delgado. The five-minute character piece features a montage of various Ballarat locations with a voiceover of Rocky describing his life in town and musings on human nature.

Ballarat is used as a meeting point for four-wheel-drive expeditions into the Panamint Range and Death Valley, and in winter up to 300 people camp in the grounds of the town. The town was recently used as a set to tell the story of the Ballarat Bandit.

Ballarat was featured in an episode of Top Gear USA and the movie Obselidia.

The town has a ZIP Code of 93592, and is inside area codes 442 and 760.

Ballarat in fiction
Ballarat has featured in Western fiction including Hellbound for Ballarat (1970) by Nelson C. Nye and Bounty Hunt at Ballarat (1973) by Clayton Matthews.

See also
 List of ghost towns

References

External links
 GhostTowns.com: Ballarat
 Desertusa.com: Ballarat
 Digital-Desert: Ballarat

Ghost towns in Inyo County, California
Mining communities in California
Panamint Range
Populated places in the Mojave Desert
Unincorporated communities in Inyo County, California
History of the Mojave Desert region
History of Inyo County, California
Populated places established in 1897
1879 establishments in California
Unincorporated communities in California